Jagraon is a city and a municipal council, a rural police district and a sub-division of the Ludhiana district in the Indian state of Punjab. Jagraon is more than three centuries old. Jagraon is at almost the geographical center of the state,  from the River Satluj.

History and religious significance
 

Jagraon is the home of Lala Lajpat Rai, a well-known figure in the Indian Independence movement, who greatly influenced Bhagat Singh. His house is now a municipal library. The chiefs of Jagraon, according to Major Charles Francis Massy's Chiefs and Families of Note in the Punjab, were Chandravanshi Rajputs, the last being Rai Inayat Khan, the custodian of Guru Sahib's Ganga Sagar at the time of the Partition of India in 1947. Rai Aziz Ullah Khan ex-MP (MNA) in Pakistan is the grandson of Rai Inayat Khan. Soldier Havildar Ishar Singh, who fought the "Battle of Saragarhi" in 1897, was also a native of Jagraon.

Jagraon is most famous for  Roshni Mela which is held at the mazar of Peer Baba Mohkumdeen. This event sees the attendance of thousands of people from all over Punjab,  Haryana, Uttar Pradesh, Himachal Pradesh

Geography and connectivity

Demographics
According to the 2001 Indian census, Jagraon had a population of 60,106. Males constituted 53% of the population and females 47%. Jagraon had an average literacy rate of 68%, higher than the national average of 59.5%: male literacy is 71%, and female literacy is 65%. In Jagraon, 11% of the population was under 6 years of age.

See also
 Chakar
 Ghalab
 Ludhiana
 Mullanpur Dakha
 Sujapur village
 S. Govt. College of Science Education and Research

References

External links
 Official site for Jagraon city

Cities and towns in Ludhiana district